was a JR East railway station located in the city of Kesennuma, Miyagi Prefecture, Japan. The station was damaged by the 2011 Tōhoku earthquake and tsunami; however services have now been replaced by a provisional bus rapid transit line.

Lines
Ōya-Kaigan Station was served by the Kesennuma Line, and was located 58.3 rail kilometers from the terminus of the line at Maeyachi Station.

Station layout
Ōya-Kaigan Station had one side platform serving a single bi-directional track. The station was unattended.

History
The station was absorbed into the JR East network upon the privatization of the Japan National Railways (JNR) on April 1, 1987. The station changed its name to its present name on 22 March 1997. The 2011 Tōhoku earthquake and tsunami severely damaged he station and nearby tracks, and rail services have now been replaced by a bus rapid transit line.

The station building was later demolished and the Otani Road Station has been established in its place.

Surrounding area
Japan National Route 45
Ōya Beach
Ōya Post Office

External links

 JR East Station information 
  video of a train trip from Rikuzen-Hashikami Station to Motoyoshi Station in 2009, passing through Ōya-Kaigan Station and Koganezawa Station without stopping at around 03:25 minutes and 06:30 minutes, respectively.  Satellite photos (e.g., in Google Maps) showed that large sections of track and railway bridges were severely affected or washed away by the 2011 tsunami.  Rikuzen-Hashikami Station was undamaged, Ōya-Kaigan Station was badly damaged or destroyed, and Koganezawa Station was damaged.

Railway stations in Miyagi Prefecture
Kesennuma Line
Railway stations in Japan opened in 1957
Railway stations closed in 2011
Kesennuma